Youth politics is a category of issues which distinctly involve, affect or otherwise impact youth. It encompasses youth policy that specifically has an impact on young people (for example, education, housing, employment, leisure) and how young people engage in politics including in institutional politics (elections, membership of a political party), youth organisations and lifestyle.

History

United States

With roots in the early youth activism of the Newsboys and Mother Jones' child labor protests at the turn of the 20th century, youth politics were first identified in American politics with the formation of the American Youth Congress in the 1930s. In the 1950s and 1960s organizations such as the Student Nonviolent Coordinating Committee and Students for a Democratic Society were closely associated with youth politics, despite the broad social statements of documents including the liberal Port Huron Statement and the conservative Sharon Statement and leaders such as Martin Luther King Jr. Other late-period figures associated with youth politics include Tom Hayden, Marian Wright Edelman and Bill Clinton.

Europe
Youth politics have an extensive history in Europe, as well. Free German Youth was founded in 1946 in the Soviet occupation zone of Germany, and served as the official youth organization of East Germany.

In the UK there is a strong youth politics movement, consisting primarily of the British Youth Council, the UK Youth Parliament and the Scottish Youth Parliament. Although they have no direct power, the young people in these organisations have a close working relationship with Members of Parliament and are fairly influential, albeit ineffectual at bringing about direct change or tangible objectives. Many organisations that strive for youth movement are on the rise. A notable organisation is YouthDebates, an online organisation aiming to engage young people into the world of politics.

Globally
Other continents have experienced a variety of youth politics and political movements.

In the recent Mexico’s presidential election another manifestation of how the youth take the politics in the actual world were see, the students movement called “Yo soy 132” made a very notable change in how the elections developed, showing proofs of the electoral fraud they thought will happen, they changed the percentage of acceptation of the PRI candidate, Enrique Peña Nieto and they achieved to decrease it around 12 percentage points between the highest poll results for the candidate and the final results of the elections.
In India youth politicians play an important role. Rishabh Mukati is the youngest politician and leader of India. He has organised sports events and various programs to help youth realize their dreams and awaken the Youth Power of India. 
Increasingly, young people are involved in global youth-led protest movements, for example, about social and environmental justice. This activism is in part because young people have been particularly affected by various crises (political, social, economic, environmental) notably austerity. Moreover, young people tend to have more post-materialist values (see work by Ronald Inglehart).

Present
Between the influence of mainstream media and politicians, youth politics in the United States has been illegitimated and deprioritized. Organizations such as National Youth Rights Association and The Freechild Project continue to advocate and educate for issues that affect young people specifically, while other organizations, including Youth Service America and Advocates for Youth work for issues that affect youth directly. The children's rights movement is widely credited with keeping youth politics on the national radar, while other fledgling movements such as youth voice and youth participation have yet to gain the spotlight.Even with the efforts of these organizations, many college students do not see politics as an important part of their lives.  Only 33% of college freshmen think being knowledgeable about politics is important. Data collected in by the National Center for Education Statistics found that overall young Americans care more about entertainment and sports than political and foreign news. Despite these statistics there is a positive outlook on youth involvement in the future because of the 2008 election when President Barack Obama ran.

List of current youth politics issues
There are several issues which are deemed "youth politics" by politicians, mainstream media and other sources.
Age of candidacy
Age of majority
Child labor laws/Right-to-work laws
Climate Change
Corporal punishment
The draft
Drinking age
Driving age
Education policy/reform
Emancipation of minors
Environmental issues
Global Warming
Healthcare
Immigration
Minors and abortion
National service
School reform
Student rights
Voting age
Youth participation
Youth service
Youth vote

List of current youth politics organizations
There are thousands of youth political organizations and programs around the world.

Akhil Bharatiya Vidyarthi Parishad
All India Socialist Youth Council
All-Polish Youth 
Bibeksheel Nepali
British Youth Council
Bus Project
Canadian Youth Policy Association
Christian Democratic Youth
College Democrats of America
College Republican National Committee
Communist Youth of Côte d'Ivoire
Communist Youth Movement
Democratic Youth Movement
Egypt Youth Party
European Free Alliance Youth
European Liberal Youth
Green Youth, Germany
Green Youth, Sweden
High School Democrats of America
Indian Youth Congress
International Federation of Liberal Youth
JONG
Jugendverband REBELL
Malaysian United Democratic Alliance
National Youth Organisation (disambiguation)
Northern Ireland Young Communist League
Puerto Rico Statehood Students Association
Sangguniang Kabataan
Sveriges Socialdemokratiska Ungdomsförbund (Sweden)
Scottish Young Liberals
Scottish Youth Parliament
Traction
Teenage Republicans
Turkey Youth Union
UK Youth Parliament
 YIP Institute
Young Democrats for Europe
Young Democrats of America
Young Independence
Young Liberals of Canada
Youth wings of political parties in Denmark
Youth of the Danish People's Party
Youth of the Progress Party
Youth of the Popular Movement against EU
Young Americans for Freedom
Young Communist League of Germany
Young Ecologists
Young Republicans
Not too young to run
National Youth Council of Nigeria NYCN

See also
Youth voice
Youth activism
Youth empowerment
Youth rights
Youth organizations
List of youth councils
:Category:Youth model government
:Category:Youth wings of green parties
Youth exclusion
Youth in Hong Kong

References

External links
youth and politics
 Sitaraman, G. and Warren, P. (2003) Invisible Citizens: Youth Politics After September 11. Writers Club Press.
 Daifallah, A. (1999) A Blueprint for student political influence. Originally published in the Peterborough Examiner. Institute on
 Shumilov A. (2012) Factors of formation of electoral policy in the youth environment // PolitBook. №1. P. 75-85.
Governance website.
 Hansson K. and Lundahl L. (2004) "Youth politics and local constructions of youth," British Journal of Sociology of Education, Volume 25(2) April 2004, pp. 161–178.
SpunOut.ie Irish National Youth Website
Giroux, H. (2001) "Zero Tolerance: Youth and the politics of domestic militarization, Part I," Z Magazine.
Youth Political Bloggers